The king of spades is a playing card in the standard 52-card deck.

King of Spades may also refer to:
 King of Spades (novel), a 1966 novel by Frederick Manfred, the fourth book in The Buckskin Man Tales series
 King of Spades, a fictional character, a member of the villainous Royal Flush Gang in DC Comics

See also

 or 

 King of Clubs (disambiguation)
 King of Diamonds (disambiguation)
 King of Hearts (disambiguation)
 Jack of Spades (disambiguation)
 Queen of Spades (disambiguation)
 Ace of Spades (disambiguation)
 Ispade Rajavum Idhaya Raniyum (English : King of Spades & Queen of Hearts), a 2019 Indian Tamil language romantic thriller film